Fanletter Please is a South Korean television series starring Choi Soo-young, Yoon Park, and Shin Yeon-woo. It aired on MBC TV from November 18 to 26, 2022, every Friday and Saturday at 21:50 (KST) for four episodes.

Synopsis
Fanletter Please tells the story of Han Kang-hee (Choi Soo-young), a top celebrity in South Korea, who faces her biggest crisis after accidentally receiving a fake fan letter sent by Bang Jeong-seok (Yoon Park) to his sick daughter in order to fulfill her wishes of getting a reply from her idol. It turns out that Bang Jeong-seok (Yoon Park) and Han Kang-hee (Choi Soo-young) were high school classmate in their senior years till a missunderstanding on Kang-hee part made them to not be together.

Cast

Main
 Choi Soo-young as Han Kang-hee
 A top celebrity.
 Yoon Park as Bang Jeong-seok
 An unmarried man who raises his sick daughter alone.
 Shin Yeon-woo as Bang Yu-na
 Jeong-seok's daughter.

Supporting
 Kang Da-hyun as Koo Hye-ri
 Friend of Han Kang-hee during their medical school days.
 Kim Sang-woo as Hoon
 Manager of Han Kang-hee.
 Jung In-ji as Yoon Ah-young 
 Representative of the agency of Korean star Han Kang-hee.
 Jung Jae-sung as Son Hyuk-soo 
 Entertainment reporter.
 Choi Ha-yoon as Oh Yeon-hee
 High school classmate of Han Kang-hee.
 Stephen Brown as an American TV Producer in the Camilla Chloe Show.

Ratings

References

External links
  
 
 

MBC TV original programming
Korean-language television shows
South Korean romantic comedy television series
2022 South Korean television series debuts
2022 South Korean television series endings